Miletkovo is a village in the municipality of Gevgelija, North Macedonia. It used to be part of the former municipality Miravci.

Demographics
As of the 2021 census, Miletkovo had 113 residents with the following ethnic composition:
Macedonians 110
Albanians 3

According to the 2002 census, the village had a total of 117 inhabitants. Ethnic groups in the village include:
Macedonians 107
Serbs 10

References

Villages in Gevgelija Municipality